Leonard Hsing Yin Shean (15 June 1958 – 1 June 2021) was a Malaysian politician. He was the single-term Member of Parliament (MP) for Tanjong Aru (1986-1990). He was also a member of the Democratic Action Party (DAP).

Background 
Hsing was born on 15 June 1958 and in Kota Kinabalu, Sabah. He finished his tertiary study in Architecture at University of Wales Institute of Science and Technology (now known as Cardiff University). 

He was married to Dorothy Cornelius Jimbangan, a native Kadazan woman from suburban Penampang and the couple has a daughter named Sonia Hsing Shiang Nee.

Political career 
Hsing joined the DAP on 28 October 1986, at the time he had just returned to his hometown Kota Kinabalu after he graduated. He was only 28 then when he was first elected to the Parliament of Malaysia for winning the Tanjung Aru federal seat in the 1986 General Election. Hsing together with Fung Ket Wing (Sandakan), Gerard Math Lee Min (Gaya) and Samson Chin Chee Tsu (Tawau) were the first 4 MPs of DAP ever to have won parliamentary seats in Sabah then who had held them only for one term after DAP defeats in the 1990 General Election. After his parliamentary term ended, Hsing became a contractor but continued to remain with DAP and was involved in party work, especially in community service as a former MP.

Death
Hsing died on 1 June 2021 9.52 pm, at the age of 62 and was two weeks away to be 63, after battling the COVID-19 infection for nearly a month at the intensive care unit (ICU) of Queen Elizabeth Hospital 1 (QEH1) in Kota Kinabalu. He was earlier confirmed to be COVID-19 positive and admitted into the hospital on 5 May. His death was confirmed by his younger brother Tony Hsing. His body was cremated at Fook Look Siew Crematorium after encoffining service at QEH1 thereafter the ashes interred at St. Joseph Benevolent Columbarium, 4½ Mile Old Penampang Road Roman Catholic Cemetery, Kota Kinabalu for his final resting place on 5 June according to the COVID-19 pandemic standard operating procedure (SOP).

Election results

See also

 Ethnic Chinese in the Dewan Rakyat
 List of politicians of Chinese descent
 List of deaths due to COVID-19 - notable individual deaths

References

External links 
 

1958 births
2021 deaths
People from Sabah
Malaysian politicians of Chinese descent
Malaysian Christians
Malaysian people of Hakka descent
Malaysian Roman Catholics
Democratic Action Party (Malaysia) politicians
Members of the Dewan Rakyat
Alumni of Cardiff University
Deaths from the COVID-19 pandemic in Malaysia
21st-century Malaysian politicians